The 2011–12 GNF2 was the 50th season of Botola 2, the second division of the Moroccan football league. The season commenced on the 20 August 2011 and  concluded on the 30 May 2012.

Team change

Teams relegated from 2010–11 Botola
 Kawkab Marrakech
 JS de Kasbah Tadla

Teams promoted to 2010–11 GNFA 1
 Renaissance Sportive Berkane

Teams reinstated 
 Raja Beni Mellal

Table

See also 
 2010–11 Botola

External links 
 Soccerway.com Botola2 Webpage

GNF 2 seasons
Moro
2011–12 in Moroccan football